The MI AC PR are a series of French minimum metal blast resistant mine anti-tank blast mines. The mines can be laid by hand or automatically from the Matenin mine laying system at a rate of 500 per hour. The mines use a clockwork arming delay, which can also self neutralize the mine after a set period. They have a secondary fuze well in the base that allows anti-handling devices to be fitted.

The mine is still in production and is in service with the French army, as well as a number of others.

Specifications
 Length: 282 mm
 Width 188 mm
 Height: 104 mm
 Weight: 5.67 kg
 Explosive content: 3.94 kg of TNT

Variants
 MI AC PR F1
 MI AC PR F2
 MI AC PR H - fitted with a carrying handle.

References
 Jane's Mines and Mine Clearance 2005-2006
 

Anti-tank mines
Land mines of France